In algebraic number theory, a reflection theorem or Spiegelungssatz (German for reflection theorem – see Spiegel and Satz) is one of a collection of theorems linking the sizes of different ideal class groups (or ray class groups), or the sizes of different isotypic components of a class group.  The original example is due to Ernst Eduard Kummer, who showed that the class number of the cyclotomic field , with p a prime number, will be divisible by p if the class number of the maximal real subfield  is.  Another example is due to Scholz.  A simplified version of his theorem states that if 3 divides the class number of a real quadratic field , then 3 also divides the class number of the imaginary quadratic field .

Leopoldt's Spiegelungssatz
Both of the above results are generalized by Leopoldt's "Spiegelungssatz", which relates the p-ranks of different isotypic components of the class group of a number field considered as a module over the Galois group of a Galois extension.

Let L/K be a finite Galois extension of number fields, with group G, degree prime to p and L containing the p-th roots of unity.  Let A be the p-Sylow subgroup of the class group of L.  Let φ run over the irreducible characters of the group ring Qp[G] and let Aφ denote the corresponding direct summands of A.  For any φ let q = pφ(1) and let the G-rank eφ be the exponent in the index

Let ω be the character of G

The reflection (Spiegelung) φ* is defined by

Let E be the unit group of K.  We say that ε is "primary" if  is unramified, and let E0 denote the group of primary units modulo Ep.  Let δφ denote the G-rank of the φ component of E0.

The Spiegelungssatz states that

Extensions
Extensions of this Spiegelungssatz were given by Oriat and Oriat-Satge, where class groups were no longer associated with characters of the Galois group of K/k, but rather by ideals in a group ring over the Galois group of K/k.  Leopoldt's Spiegelungssatz was generalized in a different direction by Kuroda, who extended it to a statement about ray class groups.  This was further developed into the very general "T-S reflection theorem" of Georges Gras.  Kenkichi Iwasawa also provided an Iwasawa-theoretic reflection theorem.

References

 

Theorems in algebraic number theory